Promedia Verlag is an Austrian publishing house established in 1983. Founded to publish "books against the grain", particularly in the field of cultural history, it has since expanded to cover politics, history and travel books. Its "Edition Spuren" brand focuses on alternative or neglected histories of Austria (such as the role of women in the resistance to the 1938 Anschluss), while the "Brennpunkt Osteuropa" series focuses on the politics and history of eastern Europe. Published authors include Johan Galtung, Edgar Morin, Alain Lipietz and Immanuel Wallerstein.

References

External links
  

Book publishing companies of Austria
Publishing companies established in 1983
Companies based in Vienna
Mass media in Vienna
Austrian companies established in 1983